Brunst is a surname. Notable people with the surname include:

 Alexander Brunst (born 1995), German footballer 
 Stanley Ernest Brunst (1894–1962), Canadian painter

See also
 Bruns
 Brunt